The history of the Jews in Iraq is documented from the time of the Babylonian captivity c. 586 BC. Iraqi Jews constitute one of the world's oldest and most historically significant Jewish communities. 

The Jewish community in Mesopotamia, known in Jewish sources as "Babylonia", was first established in the early sixth century BCE, when a large number of Judeans from the defeated Kingdom of Judah were exiled to Babylon in several waves by the Neo-Babylonian Empire. A few decades later, some had returned to Judah, following the edict of Cyrus. During this time, the Temple in Jerusalem was rebuilt, significant changes in Jewish religious tradition were made, and the Judeans were led by individuals who made Aliyah from Babylonia, such as Zerubbabel, Ezra and Nehemiah.

Though not much is known about the community in Babylonia during the Second Temple and Mishnaic periods, scholars believe the community was still thriving and prospering at that time. The Jewish community of Babylonia rose to prominence as the center of Jewish scholarship following the decline of the Jewish population in the Land of Israel in the 3rd century CE. It became home to many important Talmudic yeshivas such as the Nehardea, Pumbedita and Sura Academies, and the Babylonian Talmud was compiled there. The Mongol invasion and Islamic discrimination under the Caliphates in the Middle Ages eventually led to its decline. Under the Ottoman Empire, the Jews of Iraq fared better. The community established modern schools in the second half of the 19th century. Driven by persecution, which saw many of the leading Jewish families of Baghdad flee for India, and expanding trade with British colonies, the Jews of Iraq established a trading diaspora in Asia known as the Baghdadi Jews.

The Iraqi Jewish community formed a homogeneous group, maintaining communal Jewish identity, culture and traditions. The Jews in Iraq distinguished themselves by the way they spoke in their old Arabic dialect, Judeo-Arabic; the way they dressed; observation of Jewish rituals, for example, the Sabbath and holidays; and kashrut. In the 20th century, Iraqi Jews played an important role in the early days of Iraq's independence. Between 1950 and 1952, 120,000–130,000 of the Iraqi Jewish community (around 75%) reached Israel in Operation Ezra and Nehemiah.

The religious and cultural traditions of Iraqi Jews are kept alive today in strong communities established by Iraqi Jews in Israel, especially in Or Yehuda, Givatayim and Kiryat Gat. According to government data as of 2014, there were 227,900 Jews of Iraqi descent in Israel, with other estimates as high as 600,000 Israelis having some Iraqi ancestry. Smaller communities upholding Iraqi Jewish traditions in the Jewish diaspora exist in the United Kingdom, Ireland, Australia, Singapore, Canada, and the United States.

The term "Babylonia"
What Jewish sources called "Babylon" and "Babylonia" may refer to the ancient city of Babylon and the Neo-Babylonian Empire; or, very often, it means the specific area of Mesopotamia (the region between the Tigris and the Euphrates rivers) where a number of Jewish religious academies functioned during the Geonic period (6th–11th century CE).

Early Biblical history
In the Bible, Babylon and the country of Babylonia are not always clearly distinguished, in most cases the same word being used for both. In some passages the land of Babylonia is called Shinar, while in the post-exilic literature it is called Chaldea. In the Book of Genesis, Babylonia is described as the land in which Babel, Erech, Accad, and Calneh are located – cities that are declared to have formed the beginning of Nimrod's kingdom.

In the historical books, Babylonia is frequently referred to (there are no fewer than thirty-one allusions in the Books of Kings), though the lack of a clear distinction between the city and the country is sometimes puzzling. In Books of Chronicles, Ezra, and Nehemiah the interest is transferred to Cyrus (see, for example), though the retrospect still deals with the conquests of Nebuchadnezzar, and Artaxerxes is mentioned once.

In the poetical literature of Israel, Babylonia plays an insignificant part (see , and especially Psalm 137), but it fills a very large place in the Prophets. The Book of Isaiah resounds with the "burden of Babylon", though at that time it still seemed a "far country". In the number and importance of its references to Babylonian life and history, the Book of Jeremiah stands preeminent in the Hebrew literature. With numerous important allusions to events in the reign of Nebuchadnezzar, Jeremiah has become a valuable source in reconstructing Babylonian history within recent times. The inscriptions of Nebuchadnezzar are almost exclusively devoted to building operations; and but for the Book of Jeremiah, little would be known of his campaign against Jerusalem.

Babylonian captivity and return to Zion

During the 6th century BCE, the Jews of the ancient Kingdom of Judah were exiled to Babylon by Nebuchadnezzar in three waves. These three separate occasions are mentioned in the Book of Jeremiah. The first was in the time of Jehoiachin in 597 BC, when, in retaliation for a refusal to pay tribute, the First Temple in Jerusalem was partially despoiled and a number of the leading citizens removed (Book of Daniel). After eleven years, in the reign of Zedekiah—who had been enthroned by Nebuchadnezzar—a fresh revolt of the Judaeans took place, perhaps encouraged by the close proximity of the Egyptian army. The city was razed to the ground, and a further deportation ensued. Finally, five years later, Jeremiah records a third captivity. After the overthrow of Babylonia by the Persians, Cyrus gave the Jews permission to return to their native land (537 BC), and more than forty thousand are said to have availed themselves of the privilege. (See Jehoiakim; Ezra; Nehemiah.)

The earliest accounts of the Jews exiled to Babylonia are furnished only by scanty biblical details, although a number of archaeological discoveries shed light into the social lives of the deportees; certain sources seek to supply this deficiency from the realms of legend and tradition. Thus, the so-called "Small Chronicle" (Seder Olam Zutta) endeavors to preserve historic continuity by providing a genealogy of the exilarchs ("Reshe Galuta") back to King Jeconiah; indeed, Jeconiah himself is made an exilarch. The "Small Chronicle's" states that Zerubbabel returned to Judea in the Greek period. Certainly, the descendants of the Davidic line occupied an exalted position among their brethren in Babylonia, as they did at that period in Judea. During the Maccabean revolt, these Judean descendants of the royal house had immigrated to Babylonia.

Achaemenid period 
According to the biblical account, the Persian emperor Cyrus the Great was "God's anointed", having freed the Jews from Babylonian rule. After the conquest of Babylonia by the Persian Achaemenid Empire Cyrus granted all the Jews citizenship and by decree allowed the Jews to return to Israel (around 537 BCE). Subsequently, successive waves of Babylonian Jews emigrated to Israel.  Ezra (/ˈɛzrə/; Hebrew: עֶזְרָא, ‘Ezrā;[1] fl. 480–440 BCE), also called Ezra the Scribe (עֶזְרָא הַסּוֹפֵר, Ezra ha-Sofer) and Ezra the Priest in the Book of Ezra, a Jewish scribe (sofer) and priest (kohen), returned from Babylonian exile and reintroduced the Torah in Jerusalem (Ezra 7–10 and Neh 8).

Hellenistic period
With Alexander the Great's campaign, accurate information concerning the Jews in the East reached the western world. Alexander's army contained numerous Jews who refused, from religious scruples, to take part in the reconstruction of the destroyed Belus temple in Babylon. The accession of Seleucus Nicator, 312 BC, to whose extensive empire Babylonia belonged, was accepted by the Jews and Syrians for many centuries as the commencement of a new era for reckoning time, called "minyan sheṭarot", æra contractuum, or era of contracts, which was also officially adopted by the Parthians. This so-called Seleucid era survived in the Orient long after it had been abolished in the West (see Sherira's "Letter," ed. Neubauer, p. 28). Nicator's foundation of a city, Seleucia, on the Tigris is mentioned by the Rabbis (Midr. The. ix. 8); both the "Large" and the "Small Chronicle" contain references to him. The important victory which the Jews are said to have gained over the Galatians in Babylonia (see II Maccabees – ) must have happened under Seleucus Callinicus or under Antiochus III. The last-named settled a large number of Babylonian Jews as colonists in his western dominions, with the view of checking certain revolutionary tendencies disturbing those lands. Mithridates (174–136 BC) subjugated, about the year 160, the province of Babylonia, and thus the Jews for four centuries came under Parthian domination.

Parthian period

Jewish sources contain no mention of Parthian influence; the very name "Parthian" does not occur, unless indeed "Parthian" is meant by "Persian", which occurs now and then. The Armenian prince Sanatroces, of the royal house of the Arsacides, is mentioned in the "Small Chronicle" as one of the successors (diadochoi) of Alexander. Among other Asiatic princes, the Roman rescript in favor of the Jews reached Arsaces as well (I Macc. xv. 22); it is not, however, specified which Arsaces. Not long after this, the Partho-Babylonian country was trodden by the army of a Jewish prince; the Syrian king, Antiochus VII Sidetes, marched, in company with Hyrcanus I, against the Parthians; and when the allied armies defeated the Parthians (129 BC) at the Great Zab (Lycus), the king ordered a halt of two days on account of the Jewish Sabbath and Feast of Weeks. In 40 BC. the Jewish puppet-king, Hyrcanus II, fell into the hands of the Parthians, who, according to their custom, cut off his ears in order to render him unfit for rulership. The Jews of Babylonia, it seems, had the intention of founding a high-priesthood for the exiled Hyrcanus, which they would have made quite independent of Judea. But the reverse was to come about: the Judeans received a Babylonian, Ananel by name, as their high priest which indicates the importance enjoyed by the Jews of Babylonia. Still in religious matters the Babylonians, as indeed the whole diaspora, were in many regards dependent upon Judea. They went on pilgrimages to Jerusalem for the festivals.

How free a hand the Parthians permitted the Jews is perhaps best illustrated by the rise of the little Jewish robber-state in Nehardea (see Anilai and Asinai). Still more remarkable is the conversion of the king of Adiabene to Judaism. These instances show not only the tolerance, but the weakness of the Parthian kings. The Babylonian Jews wanted to fight in common cause with their Judean brethren against Vespasian; but it was not until the Romans waged war under Trajan against Parthia that they made their hatred felt; so that it was in a great measure owing to the revolt of the Babylonian Jews that the Romans did not become masters of Babylonia too. Philo speaks of the large number of Jews resident in that country, a population which was no doubt considerably swelled by new immigrants after the First Jewish-Roman War (66–73 CE).

At the height of the war, Jerusalem and the Second Temple were destroyed. These events caused a wide dispersion of Jews in which many probably ended up in Babylonia. The Jews of Babylon would for the first time write prayers in a language other than Hebrew, such as the Kaddish, written in Judeo-Aramaic – a harbinger of the many languages in which Jewish prayers in the diaspora would come to be written in, such as Greek, Arabic, and Turkish.

Accustomed in Jerusalem from early times to look to the east for help, and aware, as the Roman procurator Petronius was, that the Jews of Babylon could render effectual assistance, Babylonia became with the fall of Jerusalem the very bulwark of Judaism. The collapse of the Bar Kochba revolt no doubt added to the number of Jewish refugees in Babylon.

In the continuous Roman–Persian Wars, the Jews had every reason to hate the Romans, the destroyers of their sanctuary, and to side with the Parthians, their protectors. Possibly it was recognition of services thus rendered by the Jews of Babylonia, and by the Davidic house especially, that induced the Parthian kings to elevate the princes of the Exile, who until then had been little more than mere collectors of revenue, to the dignity of real princes, called Resh Galuta. Thus, then, the numerous Jewish subjects were provided with a central authority which assured an undisturbed development of their own internal affairs.

Sasanian period

A new ruling family from an ancient dynasty of Iranian priests took control of the region around 223 CE and imposed a new system of government based on Zoroastrianism and local Iranian identity, which often suppressed dissident factions and heterodox views. It dominated the area until the Muslim conquest in the seventh century CE and became known as the Sasanian Empire. The Babylonian Talmud was written during this time and is a source of information for the political, religious, social, and linguistic facets of the empire. Under the Sasanians, Babylonia became the province of Asoristan, with its main city, Ctesiphon, becoming the capital of the Empire.

Although there were some tensions between the Jewish community and Zoroastrian priests who sought to unify the entire empire under one religion and were less tolerant than their forebears during the early Sasanian era, the Jewish community's stature and their religious and communal autonomy were generally maintained. The Jewish communities in Mesopotamia flourished, particularly in the fourth century CE, as a result of Shapur's tolerant rule and the Christianization of the Roman Empire, which led to a large Jewish migration from Roman-controlled territory into the only Roman-independent region, the Sasanian Empire. While occasionally there were disputes between Jews and the authorities, the Talmudic texts mainly show respect for the Sasanian government, and the Amora Samuel of Nehardea's remark - "dina demalchuta dina" (The law of the kingdom, the governing empire, must be upheld) reflects this attitude.

Shapur I (Shvor Malka, which is the Aramaic form of the name) was a friend to the Jews. His friendship with Shmuel gained many advantages for the Jewish community. Shapur II's mother was Jewish, and this gave the Jewish community a relative freedom of religion and many advantages. Shapur was also the friend of a Babylonian rabbi in the Talmud called Raba, and Raba's friendship with Shapur II enabled him to secure a relaxation of the oppressive laws enacted against the Jews in the Persian Empire. In addition, Raba sometimes referred to his top student Abaye with the term Shvur Malka meaning "Shapur [the] King" because of his bright and quick intellect.

Christians, Manicheans, Buddhists and Jews at first seemed at a disadvantage, especially under Sasanian high-priest Kartir; but the Jews, dwelling in more compact masses in cities like Isfahan, were not exposed to such general discrimination as broke out against the more isolated Christians.

Babylonian academies and the Babylonian Talmud 
The rabbi Abba Arikha (175–247 CE), known as Rab due to his status as the highest authority in Judaism, is considered by the Jewish oral tradition the key leader, who along with the whole people in diaspora, maintained Judaism after the destruction of Jerusalem. After studying in Syria Palaestina at the academy of Judah HaNasi, Rab returned to his Babylonian home; his arrival, in the year 530 in the Seleucidan calendar, or 219, is considered to mark the beginning of a new era for the Jewish people, initiating the dominant role that the Babylonian academies played for several centuries, for the first time surpassing Judea and Galilee in the quality of Torah study. Most Jews to this day rely on the quality of the work of Babylonian scholars during this period over that of the Galilee from the same period. The Jewish community of Babylon was already learned, but Rab focused and organised their study. Leaving an existing Babylonian academy at Nehardea for his colleague Samuel, Rab founded a new academy at Sura, where he and his family already owned property, and which was known as a Jewish city. Rab's move created an environment in which Babylon had two contemporary leading academies that competed with one another, yet were so far removed from one another that they could never interfere with each other's operations. Since Rab and Samuel were acknowledged peers in position and learning, their academies likewise were considered of equal rank and influence. Their relationship can be compared to that between the Jerusalemite academies of the Houses of Hillel and Shammai, albeit Rab and Samuel agreed with each other far more often than did the houses of Hillel and Shammai. Thus, both Babylonian rabbinical schools opened a new era for diaspora Judaism, and the ensuing discussions in their classes furnished the earliest stratum and style of the scholarly material deposited in the Babylonian Talmud. The coexistence for many decades of these two colleges of equal rank, even after the school at Nehardea was moved to Pumbedita (now Fallujah), produced for the first time in Babylonia the phenomenon of dual leadership that, with some slight interruptions, became a permanent fixture and a weighty factor in the development of the Jewish faith today.

The key work of these semi-competing academies was the compilation of the Babylonian Talmud (the discussions from these two cities), completed by Rav Ashi and Ravina, two successive leaders of the Babylonian Jewish community, around the year 520, though rougher copies had already been circulated to the Jews of the Byzantine Empire. Editorial work by the Savoraim or Rabbanan Savoraei (post-Talmudic rabbis), continued on this text's grammar for the next 250 years; much of the text did not reach its "perfected" form until around 600–700. The Mishnah, which had been completed in the early 3rd century AD, and the Babylonian Gemara (the discussions at and around these academies) together form the Talmud Bavli (the "Babylonian Talmud"). The Babylonian Jews became the keepers of the Bible. Jewish culture flourished in Babylonia during the Sasanian Empire (331–638) and catalyzed the rise of Rabbinic Judaism and central texts. Jewish scholars compiled the Babylonian Talmud starting in 474 as the spiritual codex of Judaism, transferring Judaism into a spiritual and moral movement. The Talmud, a central commentary on the Mishnah, was perceived as a "portable homeland" for the Jews in diaspora.

The three centuries in the course of which the Babylonian Talmud was developed in the academies founded by Rab and Samuel were followed by five centuries during which it was intensely preserved, studied, expounded in the schools, and, through their influence, discipline and work, recognized by the whole diaspora. Sura, Nehardea, and Pumbedita were considered the seats of diaspora learning; and the heads of these authorities were referred to later on as Geonim and were considered the highest authorities on religious matters in the Jewish world. Their decisions were sought from all sides and were accepted wherever diaspora Jewish communal life existed. They even successfully competed against the learning coming from the Land of Israel itself. In the words of the haggadist, "God created these two academies in order that the promise might be fulfilled, that 'the word of God should never depart from Israel's mouth (Isa. lix. 21). The periods of Jewish history immediately following the close of the Talmud are designated according to the titles of the teachers at Sura and Pumbedita; thus we have the time of the Geonim and that of the Saboraim. The Saboraim were the scholars whose diligent hands completed the Talmud and the first great Talmudic commentaries in the first third of the 6th century. The two academies among others, and the Jewish community they led, lasted until the middle of the 11th century, Pumbedita faded after its chief rabbi was murdered in 1038, and Sura faded soon after. Which ended for centuries the great scholarly reputation given to Babylonian Jews, as the center of Jewish thought.

Islamic Arab period

The first legal expression of Islam toward the Jews, Christians, and Zoroastrians after the conquests of the 630s were the poll-tax ("jizyah"), the tax upon real estate ("kharaj") was instituted. The first caliph, Abu Bakr, sent the famous warrior Khalid bin Al-Waleed against Iraq; and a Jew, by name Ka'ab al-Aḥbar, is said to have fortified the general with prophecies of success.

The Jews may have favored the advance of the Arabs, from whom they could expect mild treatment. Some such services it must have been that secured for the exilarch Bostanai the favor of Umar I, who awarded to him for a wife the daughter of the conquered Sasanian Chosroes II as Theophanes and Abraham Zacuto narrate. Jewish records, as, for instance, "Seder ha-Dorot," contain a Bostanai legend which has many features in common with the account of the hero Mar Zutra II, already mentioned. The account, at all events, reveals that Bostanai, the founder of the succeeding exilarch dynasty, was a man of prominence, who received from the victorious Arab general certain high privileges, such as the right to wear a signet ring, a privilege otherwise limited to Muslims.

Omar and Othman were followed by Ali (656), with whom the Jews of Babylonia sided as against his rival Mu'awiyah. A Jewish preacher, Abdallah ibn Saba, of southern Arabia, who had embraced Islam, held forth in support of his new religion, expounded Mohammed's appearance in a Jewish sense. Ali made Kufa, in Iraq, his capital, and it was there that Jews expelled from the Arabian Peninsula went (about 641). It is perhaps owing to these immigrants that the Arabic language so rapidly gained ground among the Jews of Babylonia, although a greater portion of the population of Iraq were of Arab descent. The capture by Ali of Firuz Shabur, where 90,000 Jews are said to have dwelt, is mentioned by the Jewish chroniclers. Mar Isaac, chief of the Academy of Sura, paid homage to the caliph, and received privileges from him.

The proximity of the court lent to the Jews of Babylonia a species of central position, as compared with the whole caliphate; so that Babylonia still continued to be the focus of Jewish life. The time-honored institutions of the exilarchate and the gaonate—the heads of the academies attained great influence—constituted a kind of higher authority, voluntarily recognized by the whole Jewish diaspora. But unfortunately exilarchs and geonim only too soon began to rival each other. A certain Mar Yanḳa, closely allied to the exilarch, persecuted the rabbis of Pumbedita so bitterly that several of them were compelled to flee to Sura, not to return until after their persecutor's death (about 730). "The exilarchate was for sale in the Arab period" (Ibn Daud); and centuries later, Sherira boasts that he was not descended from Bostanai. In Arabic legend, the resh galuta (ras al-galut) remained a highly important personage; one of them could see spirits; another is said to have been put to death under the last Umayyad caliph, Merwan ibn Mohammed (745–750).

The Umayyad caliph, Umar II. (717–720), persecuted the Jews. He issued orders to his governors: "Tear down no church, synagogue, or fire-temple; but permit no new ones to be built". Isaac Iskawi II (about 800) received from Harun al-Rashid (786–809) confirmation of the right to carry a seal of office. At the court of the mighty Harun appeared an embassy from the emperor Charlemagne, in which a Jew, Isaac, took part. Charles (possibly Charles the Bald) is said to have asked the "king of Babel" to send him a man of royal lineage; and in response the calif dispatched Rabbi Machir to him; this was the first step toward establishing communication between the Jews of Babylonia and European communities. Although it is said that the law requiring Jews to wear a yellow badge upon their clothing originated with Harun, and although the laws of Islam were stringently enforced by him to the detriment of the Jews, the magnificent development which Arabian culture underwent in his time must have benefited the Jews also; so that a scientific tendency began to make itself noticeable among the Babylonian Jews under Harun and his successors, especially under Al-Ma'mun (813–833).

Like the Arabs, the Jews were zealous promoters of knowledge, and by translating Greek and Latin authors, mainly at the House of Wisdom in Baghdad, contributed essentially to their preservation. They took up religio-philosophical studies (the "kalam"), siding generally with the Mutazilites and maintaining the freedom of the human will ("chadr"). The government meanwhile accomplished all it could toward the complete humiliation of the Jews. All non-believers—Magi, Jews, and Christians—were compelled by Al-Mutawakkil to wear a badge; their places of worship were confiscated and turned into mosques; they were excluded from public offices, and compelled to pay to the caliph a tax of one-tenth of the value of their houses. The caliph Al-Mu'tadhel (892–902) ranked the Jews as "state servants."

In the 7th century, the new Muslim rulers institute the kharaj land tax, which led to mass migration of Babylonian Jews from the countryside to cities like Baghdad. This in turn led to greater wealth and international influence, as well as a more cosmopolitan outlook from Jewish thinkers such as Saadiah Gaon, who now deeply engaged with Western philosophy for the first time. When the Abbasid Caliphate and the city of Baghdad declined in the 10th century, many Babylonian Jews migrated to the Mediterranean region, contributing to the spread of Babylonian Jewish customs throughout the Jewish world.

Mongol period
The Caliphate hastened to its end before the rising power of the Mongol Empire. As Bar Hebræus remarks, these Mongol tribes knew no distinction between heathens, Jews, and Christians; and their Great Khan Kublai Khan showed himself just toward the Jews who served in his army, as reported by Marco Polo.

Iraq's Jewish community reached an apex in the 12th century, with 40,000 Jews, 28 synagogues, and ten yeshivot, or Rabbinic academies. Jews participated in commerce, artisanal labor and medicine.

Hulagu (a Buddhist), the destroyer of the Caliphate (1258) and the conqueror of Palestine (1260), was tolerant toward Muslims, Jews and Christians; but there can be no doubt that in those days of terrible warfare the Jews must have suffered much with others. Under the Mongolian rulers, the priests of all religions were exempt from the poll-tax. Hulagu's second son, Aḥmed, embraced Islam, but his successor, Arghun (1284–91), hated the Muslims and was friendly to Jews and Christians; his chief counselor was a Jew, Sa'ad al-Dawla, a physician of Baghdad.

It proved a false dawn. The power of Sa’ad al-Dawla was so vexatious to the Muslim population the churchman Bar Hebraeus wrote so “were the Muslims reduced to having a Jew in the place of honor.” This was exacerbated by Sa’d al-Dawla, who ordered no Muslim be employed by the official bureaucracy. He was also known as a fearsome tax collection and rumours swirled he was planning to create a new religion of which Arghun was supposed to be the prophet. Sa’d al-Dawla was murdered two days before the death of his Arghun, then stricken by illness, by his enemies in court.

After the death of the great khan and the murder of his Jewish favorite, the Muslims fell upon the Jews, and Baghdad witnessed a regular battle between them. Gaykhatu also had a Jewish minister of finance, Reshid al-Dawla. The khan Ghazan also became a Muslim, and made the Jews second class citizens. The Egyptian sultan Naṣr, who also ruled over Iraq, reestablished the same law in 1330, and saddled it with new limitations. During this period attacks on Jews greatly increased. The situation grew dire for the Jewish community as Muslim chronicler Abbas al-’Azzawi recorded:

“These events which befell the Jews after they had attained a high standing in the state caused them to lower their voices. [Since then] we have not heard from them anything worthy of recording because they were prevented from participation in its government and politics. They were neglected and their voice was only heard [again] after a long time.”

Baghdad, reduced in importance, ravaged by wars and invasions, was eclipsed as the commercial and political centre of the Arab world. The Jewish community, shuttered out of political life, were reduced too and the status of the Exilarch and the Rabbis of the city diminished. Great numbers of Jews began to depart, seeking tranquility elsewhere in the Middle East beyond a now troubled frontier.

Mongolian fury once again devastated the localities inhabited by Jews, when, in 1393, Timur captured Baghdad, Wasit, Hilla, Basra, and Tikrit, after obstinate resistance. Many Jews who had fled to Baghdad were slaughtered. Others escaped the city to Kurdistan and Syria. Many were not so fortunate, with one report mentioning 10,000 Jews killed in Mosul, Basra, and Husun Kifa.

The ruins of Baghdad after Timur's conquests was described in 1437 by the Muslim chronicler Al-Maqrizi: “Baghdad is in ruins. It has no mosque, no congregation of believers, no call to prayer and no markets. Most of the date palms have withered. Most of the irrigation canals are blocked. It cannot be called a city.”

After the death of Timur, the region fell into the hands of marauding Turkmen tribesmen who were unable to establish a government of any kind. Ravaged by conquest, Iraq fell into lawlessness and became close to uninhabitable. Roads became dangerous and irrigation systems collapsed, seeing precious farmland in the delta region sink below water. Rapacious Bedouin filled the vacuum, rendering the caravan trade all but impossible. Denied authority of any kind and severed from its historic trading ties with the Middle East and the Far East, the ancient city of Baghdad had become a minor town.

The cumulative effect of the Mongol rampage and the social collapse that followed was that of the pre-existing Jewish community of Baghdad either died or fled. Jewish life entered a Dark Age. According to historian Zvi Yehuda, the fifteenth century sees no reports on Jews in Baghdad or in its surroundings, in Basra, Hilla, Kifil, ‘Ana, Kurdistan, even in Persia and the Persian Gulf. The organized Jewish community of Iraq appears to have disappeared in this period for more than four generations. This is behind the discontinuity between the present traditions of Iraqi Jewry and the Babylonian traditions of Talmudic or Geonic times. It remains the case that most Jewish Iraqis are of indigenous Middle Eastern ancestry rather than migrants from Spain, as in the case of parts of North Africa and the Levant.

Ottoman rule

Overview 
During Ottoman rule (1534–1917) Jewish life prospered in Iraq. Jews were afforded religious liberties, enabling them to administer their own affairs in Jewish education. Tolerance towards Jews and Jewish customs, however, depended on local rulers. Ottoman ruler Sultan Murad IV appointed 10,000 Jewish officers in his government, as he valued the Baghdadi Jews. In contrast, Murad's governor Dauod Pasha was cruel and was responsible for the emigration of many Iraqi Jews. After Dauod's death in 1851, Jewish involvement in commerce and politics increased, with religious influence also transforming. The Iraqi Jewish community introduced the Hakham Bashi, or Chief Rabbinate, in 1849, with Hakham Ezra Dangoor leading the community. The chief rabbi was also president of the community and was assisted by a lay council, a religious court, and a schools committee.

Early Ottoman period 
After various changes of fortune, Mesopotamia and Iraq came into the hands of the Ottoman Turks, when Sultan Suleiman the Magnificent in 1534 took Tabriz and Baghdad from the Persians, leading to an improvement in the life of the Jews. The Persian reconquest in 1623 during the Ottoman–Safavid War (1623–39) led to a much worse situation, so that the re-conquest of Iraq by the Turks in 1638 included an army with a large population of Jews. Some sources say they made up 10% of the army. The day of the reconquest was even given a holiday, "Yom Nes" (day of miracle).

This period of Mameluk rule in Iraq, under the aegis of the Ottoman Empire, united most of the future territory of Iraq into a single unit for the first time. As it ceased to be a warring frontier, opportunities for trade increased, especially due to the growing European presence on the ocean routes to India. Following this uptick in trade and security, Jewish communities began to be reestablished in Baghdad and Basra.

This was not the revival of a community so much as the establishment of a new one. According to the historian Zvi Yehuda, an analysis of the tens of thousands of Iraqi Jewish family trees stored at the Babylonian Jewry Heritage Center have indicate that families of Baghdadi Jews do not possess family trees tracing their lineage prior to the end of the 17th century. They were migrants from smaller Mesopotamian communities and from across the Middle East. Yehuda calls the Jewish community that reestablished itself in Baghdad, Basra and other cities the “new Babylonian Diaspora.”

Eighteenth century
In 1743, there was a plague in which many of the Jews of Baghdad, including all the rabbis, died.  The remaining Baghdad community asked the community of Aleppo to send them a new Chief Rabbi, leading to the appointment of Rabbi Sadka Bekhor Hussein. Culturally, it would prove a decisive moment when Chief Rabbi Shmuel Laniyado of Aleppo picked his protege for Baghdad. It is said he was accompanied by fifty Sephardic Jewish families from Aleppo. Many of them were Rabbis who were to sit on the Beth Din of Baghdad and Basra.

This led to an assimilation of Iraqi Judaism to the general Sephardic mode of observance. Jewish culture revived, with communal leaders as Solomon Ma’tuk being renown for his work as an astronomer, library and piyyutim. This brought the leading Jewish families of Baghdad, and with it, their Jewish practice into the network of Sephardic scribes and later printing presses established in Aleppo, Livorno and Salonica. Surviving records of the contents of the library of Solomon Ma’tuk shows a great number of books purchased from Sephardic scribes and some even originally from Spain.

Further driving this process was the high esteem in which Rabbi Sadka Bekhor Hussein was held as a halakhic authority. This saw him accepted as a halakhic authority by the Jews of Persia, Kurdistan and the fledgling Baghdadi trading outposts being established in India. Sephardic Rabbis and their rulings and practices were held in higher esteem. The historian Zvi Yehuda says the period saw the wheels turn in the relationship between the Babylonian Jewish communities and those of Iraq and Persia: “Before the 18th century, the Baghdadi Community needed the support of those communities; now the Baghdadi Community influenced them.”

The 18th century saw the Jewish community of Aleppo exert a significant influence over the Jewish communities of Baghdad and Basra not only culturally but economically. Syrian Jewish families establishing themselves in Iraq were often formerly Spanish Sephardic families from Aleppo. These were typically high-class families such as the Belilios family who were frustrated with the dimming prospects of Aleppo and attracted to Baghdad and Basra's booming trade with India. This process saw the leading Jewish families of Baghdad, Basra and Aleppo grow to be heavily interlinked through marriages, religious life, partnership and trade in the 18th century.

As this process of cultural assimilation saw the Jews of Baghdad come to more closely resemble the Jews of Aleppo, economic decline in Syria, Kurdistan and Persia worsened. The 18th century saw a growing number of Jews leave from there to Baghdad, Basra or the Baghdadi-led outposts being established in the Far East. The still small and reemerging Jewish community of Baghdad became a migration destination with Jewish families settling in Baghdad from Istanbul, Aleppo, Damascus, Ana and Basra. A key driver of this was decline of the old caravan route running between these cities. There was also migration from the communities of Palestine, the villages of Kurdistan, and it is said that a handful of Jews settled in Baghdad from Germany.

Nineteenth century
By the early 19th century, Baghdad had been reestablished as a leading Jewish center in the Middle East. There were over 6,000 Jews in city, two synagogues and strong community institutions. This was not a golden age, however. Over time, the centralized Ottoman control over the region deteriorated and the situation of the Jews worsened, but the population continued to grow very rapidly. An example of this deterioration is the persecution of Dawud Pasha, which began in 1814 and lasted until 1831. Many leaders of the Jewish community, such as Solomon Ma’tuk, were forced to flee. One of the foremost leaders of the community, David Sassoon, was forced to flee first to Busher and then to India.

By the early 19th century, trade between Baghdad and India was said to be entirely in the hands of the Jewish community. Though Jewish traders from the Middle East had been crossing the Indian Ocean since antiquity, the deteriorating situation in the Ottoman Empire and the rise of commercial opportunities in British India saw many Jews from Iraq establish themselves permanently in India, at first in Surat, then especially in Calcutta and Bombay.

This was the beginning of primarily Iraqi Jewish diaspora in Asia known as the Baghdadi Jews, to which David Sassoon and many of the other leading Jewish families in Baghdad fled the persecution of Dawud Pasha. These Judeo-Arabic speaking communities, following mostly Iraqi Jewish customs, would be formed along the so-called opium route between India and China, including in Singapore, Hong Kong and Shanghai. These were all led by leading Iraqi Jewish families such as the Sassoons, Ezras, Eliases, Gubbays and Judahs. These families were active sponsors of religious life and charity back in Iraq.

Israel Joseph Benjamin, the Ashkenazi Jewish traveller and scholar from Moldova, who conducted extensive journeys to visit even the most furthest flung Sephardic and Mizrahi Jewish communities of Asia between 1845 and 1859, wrote of Baghdad that “in no other place in the east have I found my Israelitish brothers in such perfectly happy circumstances.” One distinguishing feature of the communities of Baghdad and Basra remarked upon by Ashkenazi travelers was the extreme young age of marriage: between eight and twelve years old for girls to men usually eighteen to twenty. Another was the traditional face veils and long flowing garments wore by Jewish women who were not expected to show their face in public like their Muslim neighbors.

During the 19th century, the influence of the Jewish families of Aleppo of the previous century faded as Baghdad emerged as a strong Jewish and economic center in its own right. The Jewish population has grown so rapidly that by 1884, there were 30,000 Jews in Baghdad and by 1900, 50,000, comprising over a quarter of the city's total population. Large-scale Jewish immigration from Kurdistan to Baghdad continued throughout this period. By the mid-19th century, the religious infrastructure of Baghdad grew to include a large yeshiva which trained up to sixty rabbis at time. Religious scholarship flourished in Baghdad, which produced great rabbis, such as Joseph Hayyim ben Eliahu Mazal-Tov, known as the Ben Ish Chai (1834–1909) or Rabbi Abdallah Somekh (1813-1889).

Modern Iraq

The state of Iraq 

Early Labor Zionism mostly concentrated on the Jews of Europe, skipping Iraqi Jews because of their lack of interest in agriculture. The result was that "Until World War II, Zionism made little headway because few Iraqi Jews were interested in the socialist ideal of manual labor in Palestine."

During the British Mandate, beginning in 1920, and in the early days after independence in 1932, well-educated Jews played an important role in civic life. Iraq's first minister of finance, Sir Sassoon Eskell, was a Jew, and Jews were important in developing the judicial and postal systems. Records from the Baghdad Chamber of Commerce show that 10 out of its 19 members in 1947 were Jews and the first musical band formed for Baghdad's nascent radio in the 1930s consisted mainly of Jews. Jews were represented in the Iraqi parliament, and many Jews held significant positions in the bureaucracy. Between 1924-1928, some Jews fled persecution in Russia, arriving in Iraq as refugees.

Organized Zionist activity began in Iraq in the 1920s. The Jewish population was generally sympathetic toward the movement, although not at that time as a solution for Iraqi Jews. The Zionist organization in Baghdad was initially granted a permit by the British, in March 1921, but in the following year, under the government of King Faisal I, was unable to renew it. Nevertheless, its activities were tolerated until 1929. In that year, after conflict and bloodshed in Palestine during anti-Zionist demonstrations, Zionist activities were banned and teachers from Palestine, who had taught Hebrew and Jewish history, were forced to leave.

In the 1930s, the situation of the Jews in Iraq deteriorated. Previously, the growing Iraqi Arab nationalist sentiment included Iraqi Jews as fellow Arabs, but these views changed with the ongoing conflict in the Palestinian Mandate and the introduction of Nazi propaganda. Despite protestations of their loyalty to Iraq, Iraqi Jews were increasingly subject to discrimination and anti-Jewish actions. In September 1934, following the appointment of Arshad al-Umari as the new minister of economics and communications, tens of Jews were dismissed from their posts in that ministry; and, subsequently, there were unofficial quotas of Jews that could be appointed in the civil service or admitted to secondary schools and colleges. Zionist activity had continued covertly even after 1929, but in 1935 the last two Palestinian Jewish teachers were deported, and the president of the Zionist organization was put on trial and ultimately required to leave the country.

Following the collapse of Rashid Ali al-Gaylani's pro-Axis coup d'état in 1941, the Farhud ("violent dispossession") pogrom broke out in Baghdad on June 1, in which approximately 200 Iraqi Jews were murdered (some sources put the number higher), and up to 2,000 injured- damages to Jewish-owned property were estimated at $3 million (US$  million in ). There were also instances of looting of Jewish properties in many other cities at around the same time, with the pogrom lasting for two days until June 2. Afterwards, Jewish emissaries from Palestine were sent to teach Iraqi Jews self-defense, which they were eager to learn. The newly restored pro-Allied monarchist regime quickly implemented measures to prevent the outbreak of similar anti-Jewish violence and established a committee of enquiry on 7 June "to examine the facts and find who was culpable."

Persecution by Iraqi authorities
Before the United Nations Partition Plan for Palestine vote, Iraq's prime minister Nuri al-Said told British diplomats that if the United Nations solution was not "satisfactory", "severe measures should [would?] be taken against all Jews in Arab countries". In a speech at the General Assembly Hall at Flushing Meadow, New York, on Friday, 28 November 1947, Iraq's Foreign Minister, Muhammad Fadhel al-Jamali, included the following statement: Partition imposed against the will of the majority of the people will jeopardize peace and harmony in the Middle East. Not only the uprising of the Arabs of Palestine is to be expected, but the masses in the Arab world cannot be restrained. The Arab-Jewish relationship in the Arab world will greatly deteriorate. There are more Jews in the Arab world outside of Palestine than there are in Palestine. In Iraq alone, we have about one hundred and fifty thousand Jews who share with Muslims and Christians all the advantages of political and economic rights. Harmony prevails among Muslims, Christians and Jews. But any injustice imposed upon the Arabs of Palestine will disturb the harmony among Jews and non-Jews in Iraq; it will breed inter-religious prejudice and hatred.

In the months leading up to the November 1947 Partition vote, violence against Iraqi Jews increased. In May 1947, a Jewish man in Baghdad was lynched by an angry mob after being accused of giving poisoned candy to Arab children. Rioters ransacked homes in the Jewish Quarter of Fallujah, and the Jewish population there fled to Baghdad. Large Jewish "donations" for the Palestinian Arab cause were regularly extorted, with the names of "donors" read out on the radio to encourage more. In spite of this, Iraqi Jews still mostly continued to view themselves as loyal Iraqis and believed that the hardship would pass. The Jewish Agency's emissary to Iraq reported that "No attention is paid [by the Jews] to the frightful manifestations of hostility around them, which place all Jews on the verge of a volcano about to erupt."

In 1948, the year of Israel's independence, there were about 150,000 Jews in Iraq. Persecution of Jews greatly increased that year:
 In July 1948, the government passed a law making Zionism a capital offense, with a minimum sentence of seven years imprisonment. Any Jew could be convicted of Zionism based only on the sworn testimony of two Muslim witnesses, with virtually no avenue of appeal available.
 On August 28, 1948, Jews were forbidden to engage in banking or foreign currency transactions.
 In September 1948, Jews were dismissed from the railways, the post office, the telegraph department, and the Finance Ministry on the ground that they were suspected of "sabotage and treason".
 On October 8, 1948, the issuance of export and import licenses to Jewish merchants was forbidden.
 On October 19, 1948, the discharge of all Jewish officials and workers from all governmental departments was ordered.
 In October, the Egyptian paper El-Ahram estimated that as a result of arrests, trials, and sequestration of property, the Iraqi treasury collected some 20 million dinars or the equivalent of 80 million U.S. dollars.
 On December 2, 1948, the Iraq government suggested to oil companies operating in Iraq that no Jewish employees be accepted.
"With very few exceptions, only Jews wore watches. On spotting one that looked expensive, a policeman had approached the owner as if to ask the hour. Once assured the man was Jewish, he relieved him of the timepiece and took him into custody. The watch, he told the judge, contained tiny wireless; he'd caught the Jew, he claimed, sending military secrets to the Zionists in Palestine. Without examining the "evidence" or asking any questions, the judge pronounced his sentence. The "traitor" went to prison, the watch to the policeman as a reward."

Following the Israeli Declaration of Independence and Iraq's subsequent participation in the 1948 Arab-Israeli War, Iraq was placed under martial law. Courts martial were used to intimidate wealthy Jews, Jews were again dismissed from civil service, quotas were placed on university positions, and Jewish businesses were boycotted. In sweeps throughout urban areas, the Iraqi authorities searched thousands of Jewish homes for secret caches of money they were presumed to be sending to Israel. Walls were frequently demolished in these searches. Hundreds of Jews were arrested on suspicion of Zionist activity, tortured into confessing, and subjected to heavy fines and lengthy prison sentences. In one case, a Jewish man was sentenced to five years' hard labor for possessing a Biblical Hebrew inscription which was presumed to be a coded Zionist message.

The greatest shock to the Jewish community came with the arrest and execution of businessman Shafiq Ades, a Jewish automobile importer who was the single wealthiest Jew in the country. Ades, who had displayed no interest in Zionism, was arrested on charges of sending military equipment to Israel and convicted by a military tribunal. He was fined $20 million and sentenced to death. His entire estate was liquidated and he was publicly hanged in Basra in September 1948. The Jewish community's general sentiment was that if an assimilated and non-Zionist Jew as powerful and well-connected as Ades could be eliminated, other Jews would not be protected any longer. Additionally, like most Arab League states, Iraq forbade any legal emigration of its Jews on the grounds that they might go to Israel and could strengthen that state. At the same time, increasing government oppression of the Jews fueled by anti-Israeli sentiment together with public expressions of antisemitism created an atmosphere of fear and uncertainty.

The Iraqi Jewish community gradually became impoverished because of persecution. Jewish businesses were forced to close in the face of boycotts and arrests of Jewish businessmen. After Jews were prohibited from working in the civil service, skilled and formerly well-paid Jewish civil service employees were driven into poverty and forced to become street peddlers to avoid being arrested for vagrancy. Jewish home values dropped by 80%.

On 19 February 1949, Nuri al-Said acknowledged the bad treatment that the Jews had been victims of in Iraq during the recent months. He warned that unless Israel behaved itself, events might take place concerning the Iraqi Jews.

Operation Ezra and Nehemiah

With Iraqi Jews enduring oppression and being driven into destitution, the Iraqi Zionist underground began smuggling Jews out of Iraq to Israel starting in November 1948. Jews were smuggled into Iran and from there proceeded to Israel. By 1949, the Iraqi Zionist underground had become well-established (despite many arrests), and they were smuggling Iraqi Jews out of the country illegally at a rate of 1,000 a month. The fleeing Jews took money and some possessions with them, and this capital flight harmed the Iraqi economy. Hoping to stem the flow of assets from the country, in March 1950 Iraq passed a law of one year duration allowing Jews to emigrate on condition of relinquishing their Iraqi citizenship. They were motivated, according to Ian Black, by "economic considerations, chief of which was that almost all the property of departing Jews reverted to the state treasury" and also that "Jews were seen as a restive and potentially troublesome minority that the country was best rid of." Iraqi politicians candidly admitted that they wanted to expel their Jewish population for reasons of their own. Israel was initially reluctant to absorb so many immigrants, but mounted an airlift in March 1951 called "Operation Ezra and Nehemiah" to bring as many of the Iraqi Jews as possible to Israel, and sent agents to Iraq to urge the Jews to register for immigration as soon as possible. Iraqi Jews mainly left Iraq for Cyprus and Iran, from where they were airlifted to Israel, though for a time direct flights between Israel and Baghdad were allowed.

From the start of the emigration law in March 1950 until the end of the year, 60,000 Jews registered to leave Iraq. In addition to continuing arrests and the dismissal of Jews from their jobs, this exodus was encouraged by a series of bombings starting in April 1950 that resulted in a number of injuries and a few deaths. Two months before the expiration of the law, by which time about 85,000 Jews had registered, another bomb at the Masuda Shemtov synagogue killed 3 or 5 Jews and injured many others. Iraqi Prime Minister Nuri al-Said was determined to drive the Jews out of his country as quickly as possible, and on August 21, 1950 he threatened to revoke the license of the company transporting the Jewish exodus if it did not fulfill its daily quota of 500 Jews. The available planes initially did not match the demand, and as a result many Jews had to wait for extended periods of time in Iraq while awaiting transport to Israel. These Jews, having already been denaturalized and renounced all property, were now stateless and destitute, and many were now homeless and sleeping on the streets. The Iraqi government announced that if the Jews were not removed more swiftly, they would be placed in concentration camps. As a result, more airlines were chartered to speed up the exodus. On September 18, 1950, Nuri al-Said summoned a representative of the Jewish community and claimed Israel was behind the emigration delay, threatening to "take them to the borders" and forcibly expel the Jews. The law expired in March 1951 but was later extended after the Iraqi government froze the assets of departing Jews, including those who had already left. During the next few months, all but a few thousand of the remaining Jews registered for emigration, spurred on by a sequence of further bombings that caused few casualties but had great psychological impact.

Israel's fragile infrastructure, which already had to accommodate a mass influx of Jewish immigration from war-ravaged Europe and other Arab and Muslim countries, was heavily strained, and the Israeli government was not certain that it had enough permanent housing units and tents to accommodate the Iraqi Jews. When Israel attempted to negotiate a more gradual influx of Iraqi Jews, Said realized that the Jews could be turned into a demographic weapon against Israel. He hoped that a rapid influx of totally penniless Jews would collapse Israel's infrastructure. In March 1951, he engineered a law which would permanently freeze all assets of denaturalized Jews. Officially, the assets were merely frozen and not confiscated; under international law assets can theoretically remain frozen for perpetuity, making it impossible for them to ever be reclaimed. The law was prepared in secret, as it was being ratified, Baghdad's telephone network suspended operations to prevent Jews from learning of it and attempt to transfer or withdraw their money. Iraq's Banks were closed for three days to ensure that Jews could not access their funds. With Iraq's Jews effectively stripped of their assets permanently, Said demanded Israel accept 10,000 Iraqi Jewish refugees per month. He threatened to prohibit Jewish emigration from May 31, 1951 and to set up concentration camps for stateless Jews still in Iraq. Israel attempted to negotiate a compromise to enable the Iraqi Jews to leave gradually in a way that did not put as much pressure on Israel's absorptive capacity, but Said was adamant that the Jews had to leave as fast as possible. As a result, Israel increased the flights.

In Baghdad, the daily spectacle of Jews carrying nothing but their clothes and a bag of their remaining possessions being loaded onto trucks for transport to the airport caused public jubilation. Jews were mocked every step of the way during their departure and crowds stoned the trucks taking Jews to the airport. Jews were allowed to bring out a maximum of five pounds weight in property, which was to consist of personal effects only, as well as a small amount of cash. At the airport, Iraqi officials body searched every emigrant for cash or jewelry, and they also beat and spat on the departing Jews.

Overall, between 1948 and 1951, 121,633 Iraqi Jews were airlifted, bused, or smuggled out of the country, including 119,788 between January 1950 and December 1951. About 15,000 Jews remained in Iraq. In 1952, emigration to Israel was again banned, and the Iraqi government publicly hanged two Jews who had been falsely charged with throwing a bomb at the Baghdad office of the U.S. Information Agency.

According to Palestinian politician Aref al-Aref, Said had attempted to justify allowing the exodus by explaining to him that: ”The Jews have always been a source of evil and harm to Iraq. They are spies. They have sold their property in Iraq, they have no land among us that they can cultivate. How therefore can they live? What will they do if they stay in Iraq? No, no my friend, it is better for us to be rid of them as long as we are able to do so."

Iraqi Jews left behind them extensive property, often located in the heart of Iraq's major cities. A relatively high number found themselves in refugee camps in Israel known as Ma'abarot before being given permanent housing.

Behind the synagogue bombings
The true identity and objective of the masterminds behind the bombings has been the subject of controversy.  A secret Israeli inquiry in 1960 found no evidence that they were ordered by Israel or any motive that would have explained the attack, though it did find out that most of the witnesses believed that Jews had been responsible for the bombings. The issue remains unresolved: Iraqi activists still regularly charge that Israel used violence to engineer the exodus, while Israeli officials of the time vehemently deny it. Historian Moshe Gat reports that "the belief that the bombs had been thrown by Zionist agents was shared by those Iraqi Jews who had just reached Israel". Sociologist Phillip Mendes backs Gat's claims, and further attributes the allegations to have been influenced and distorted by feelings of discrimination.

The affair has also been the subject of a libel lawsuit by Mordechai Ben Porat, which was settled in an out-of-court compromise with an apology of the journalist who described the charges as true.

Iraqi authorities eventually charged three members of the Zionist underground with perpetrating some of the explosions. Two of those charged, Shalom Salah Shalom and Yosef Ibrahim Basri, were subsequently found guilty and executed, whilst the third was sentenced to a lengthy jail term. Salah Shalom claimed in his trial that he was tortured into confessing, and Yosef Basri maintained his innocence throughout.

Gat reports that much of the previous literature "reflects the universal conviction that the bombings had a tremendous impact on the large-scale exodus of the Jews... To be more precise it is suggested that the Zionist emissaries committed these brutal acts in order to uproot the prosperous Iraqi Jewish community and bring it to Israel".  However, Gat argues that both claims are contrary to the evidence.  As summarized by Mendes:
Historian Moshe Gat argues that there was little direct connection between the bombings and exodus. He demonstrates that the frantic and massive Jewish registration for denaturalization and departure was driven by knowledge that the denaturalisation law was due to expire in March 1951. He also notes the influence of further pressures including the property-freezing law, and continued anti-Jewish disturbances which raised the fear of large-scale pogroms. In addition, it is highly unlikely the Israelis would have taken such measures to accelerate the Jewish evacuation given that they were already struggling to cope with the existing level of Jewish immigration. Gat also raises serious doubts about the guilt of the alleged Jewish bombthrowers. Firstly, a Christian officer in the Iraqi army known for his anti-Jewish views, was arrested, but apparently not charged, with the offences. A number of explosive devices similar to those used in the attack on the Jewish synagogue were found in his home. In addition, there was a long history of anti-Jewish bomb-throwing incidents in Iraq. Secondly, the prosecution was not able to produce even one eyewitness who had seen the bombs thrown. Thirdly, the Jewish defendant Shalom Salah indicated in court that he had been severely tortured in order to procure a confession. It therefore remains an open question as to who was responsible for the bombings, although Gat argues that the most likely perpetrators were members of the anti-Jewish Istiqlal Party. Certainly memories and interpretations of the events have further been influenced and distorted by the unfortunate discrimination which many Iraqi Jews experienced on their arrival in Israel.Rayyan Al-Shawaf (2006), in a review of Abbas Shiblak's book Iraqi Jews: A History of Mass Exodus (Saqui, 2005), notes that Gat "argues that the attacks, which he presumes were the work of Iraqis of extreme nationalist persuasion, did not spur the exodus" (p. 67). Dissent, Democratiya 7, Winter issue, p. 63-81. Retrieved 15 May 2015.

Many years later, the widow of the Zionist emissary Yehuda Tager stated that while the main bombings were carried out by the Muslim Brotherhood, later smaller attacks were staged by Yosef Beit-Halahmi, on his own initiative, in an attempt to make it seem as if the activists on trial were not the perpetrators.

Later

Most of the 15,000 Jews remaining after Operation Ezra and Nehemiah stayed through the Abdul Karim Qassim era when conditions improved and began to return to normal, but anti-Semitism increased during the rule of the Arif brothers (Abdul Salam Arif and Abdul Rahman Arif).

With the rise of the Ba'ath Party to power in 1963, restrictions were placed on the remaining Iraqi Jews. Sale of property was banned, and Jews had to carry yellow identity cards.

After the 1967 Six-Day War, Jewish property was expropriated, bank accounts were frozen, Jews were dismissed from public posts, their businesses were closed, trading permits owned by Jews were cancelled, they were not allowed to use telephones, they were placed under house arrest for extended periods of time, and were under constant surveillance and restricted to the cities. In late 1968, scores of Jews were jailed on charges of spying for Israel, culminating in the 1969 public hanging of 14 men, 9 of them Jews, who were accused of spying for Israel. Other suspected spies for Israel died under torture. After Baghdad Radio invited Iraqi citizens to "come and enjoy the feast", half a million people paraded and danced past the scaffolds where the men were hanged, which resulted in international criticism. An Iraqi Jew who later left wrote that the stress of persecution caused ulcers, heart attacks, and breakdowns to become increasingly prevalent in the Jewish community. A further 18 Jews were hanged in secret from 1970 to 1972, and in April 1973 five members of a single Jewish family were killed on the orders of the head of the Iraqi secret police in retaliation for an Israeli assassination of a Palestinian leader. As a result, Jews escaped the country by traveling to Iraqi Kurdistan and then slipping into Iran with the help of Kurdish smugglers. From there many emigrated to Israel while some also moved to other countries such as the UK and Australia. In the early 1970s, bowing to international pressure and having concluded that its emigration ban was useless, the Iraqi government allowed Jewish emigration and most of the remaining Jews left. The majority of those who stayed behind were elderly, and the community was subsequently pressured by the government to turn over $200 million worth of Jewish community property without compensation. In 1974, about 400 Jews still lived in Iraq.   

The last Jewish wedding in Iraq took place in 1978 and the last brit milah took place in 1984. In 1985, one synagogue in Iraq continued to function, the Meir Taweig Synagogue, located in the Al-Bataween neighborhood, which had once been Baghdad's main Jewish neighborhood. Jews were allowed to freely practice their religion but were prohibited from holding jobs in state enterprises or joining the army.

Immediately prior to the Gulf War, the U.S. State Department noted that there was no recent evidence of overt persecution of Jews, but travel, particularly to Israel, was restricted, as was contact with Jewish groups abroad. In 1997, the Jerusalem Post reported that in the previous five years, some 75 Jews had fled Iraq, of whom about 20 moved to Israel and the rest mostly went to the United Kingdom and Netherlands. The community's only ordained rabbi died in 1996 and the last shochet, or kosher slaughterer, left in 2002. In 2003, one community member, Emad Levy, became the community's leader, functioning as its sole rabbi, kosher slaughterer, and advisor on all Judaism-related issues to those in the community. The last active synagogue closed in 2003, a few weeks before the 2003 invasion of Iraq. In the aftermath of the 2003 invasion, the Jewish Agency launched an effort to track down all of the remaining Iraqi Jews to present them with an opportunity to emigrate to Israel, and found a total of 34 Jews in Baghdad, half of whom were over the age of 70. While the community was largely elderly and poor, some were middle class including two doctors. Six chose to emigrate, among them Ezra Levy, the father of Emad Levy.

After the defeat of the Ba'ath regime, the process of establishing a new democratic government began. Among the subjects for debate over the Iraqi constitution was whether Jews should be considered a minority group, or left out of the constitution altogether.

In October 2006, Rabbi Emad Levy announced that he was leaving for Israel and compared his life to "living in a prison". He reported that most Iraqi Jews stay in their homes "out of fear of kidnapping or execution" due to sectarian violence. However, Levy remained in Iraq for four more years. He emigrated to Israel in 2010 after receiving death threats, where he subsequently married and started a family, becoming the last Iraqi Jew to emigrate. Levy remained in touch with the small Jewish community left in the country. In a 2018 interview, he said that there were five Jews still in Iraq, with one woman serving as the community director.

There are numerous estimates for the number of Jews living in Baghdad. They include thirty-four (2003) (of whom six went to Israel), eight (2007), seven (2008), ten (2008), five (2013), eight (2016), five (2018), or ten (2018). In 2020-2021, the Jewish population in Iraq was reported to be four. Among the American forces stationed in Iraq, there were only three Jewish chaplains.

In 2011, a leaked US embassy cable named 8 Jews left in Baghdad; one of whom, Emhad Levy, immigrated to Israel. Andrew White, who was Vicar of St George's Church, Baghdad, urged the remaining Jews to immigrate. White also pleaded for help in saving remaining Torah scrolls in Iraq.

Over Jewish protests, the Iraqi Jewish Archive is to be given by the U.S. government to the Iraqi government, instead of being returned to the Iraqi Jewish community; however, the archive can be seen online. In Al-Qosh, the Jewish prophet Nahum's tomb was being restored in 2020 thanks to a $1-million grant from the U.S., local authorities, and private donations. In 2020, the synagogue beside Ezekiel's Tomb was converted into a mosque.

On March 15, 2021, one of the last remaining five Jews in Iraq, Dr. Dhafer Fouad Eliyahu, died.

In November 2021, Israeli police recovered a Baghdad Torah scroll from an Arab village.

In December 2021, Jews in Iraq received Hanukkah kits.

On May 27, 2022, Iraq passed a law making contact with Israel punishable by death.
In 2021 the Jewish Population  in Iraq number is fewer than five.The number of living Jews in Iraq is 3 (2022)

Iraqi Jews 

 Many Tannaim and Amoraim, including:
 Abba Arika, "Rabh", amora
 Shmuel Yarchina'ah, "Mar Samuel", or Samuel of Nehardea, amora
 Rav Huna
 Rav Chisda
 Abaye, amora
 Rav Papa, amora
 Rav Ashi (Abana), rav, amora
 Anan ben David, founder of Qara'ism
 Alan Yentob, television executive, broadcaster
 Avi Shlaim, Oxford Professor
 Binyamin Ben-Eliezer, politician
 Dodai ben Nahman, scholar
 Shlomo Hillel, diplomat and politician
 Ya'qub Bilbul, poet
 Sir Sassoon Eskell, statesman and financier
 Marcus Samuel, 1st Viscount Bearsted, Lord Mayor of London, businessman
 Naeim Giladi, writer
 Sir Naim Dangoor, entrepreneur and philanthropist
 N.J. Dawood, translator of Koran
 Hakham Yosef Chayyim of Baghdad, "Ben Ish Chai"
 Yitzchak Kadouri, rabbi and kabbalist
 Yitzhak Yamin, painter and sculptor
 Hila Klein, member of American-Israeli husband and wife duo h3h3Productions, best known for their YouTube channel of the same name. Family is of mixed Libyan and Iraqi Jewish heritage
 Elie Kedourie, historian
 Jessica Meir, astronaut, physiologist
 Sami Michael*, writer
 Shafiq Ades, wealthy businessman
 Samir Naqqash, novelist
 Selim Zilkha, entrepreneur
 Maurice & Charles Saatchi, advertising executives
 Yona Sabar, scholar, linguist and researcher
 David Sassoon, merchant, and Sassoon family
 Yaakov Chaim Sofer, rabbi
 Ovadia Yosef, rabbi

See also

 Baghdad Jewish Arabic
 Baghdadi Jews (Jews of Iraqi origin now resident in India and Pakistan)
 Barzani Jewish Neo-Aramaic
 Iraqi Jewish Archive
 Iraqi Jews in Israel
 Jewish Babylonian Aramaic
 Jewish exodus from Arab lands
 Judeo-Iraqi Arabic
 Lishana Deni
 Lishanid Noshan
 List of Jews from Iraq
 Mandaeans
 Music of Iraq
 Operation Ezra and Nehemiah
 Religion in Iraq
 Sassoon family

Annotations

Bibliography
Notes

References
 
  – Total pages: 188 
  – Total pages: 213 
  – Total pages: 265 
 
  – Total pages: 242 
  – Total pages: 432

Further reading
 E. Black, Banking on Baghdad (Wiley, 2004).
 M. Gat, The Jewish Exodus from Iraq, 1948–1951 (Frank Cass, 1997).
 H. Haddad, Flight from Babylon (McGraw-Hill, 1986).
 S. Hillel, Operation Babylon (Doubleday, 1987). 
 N. Rejwan, The Jews of Iraq (Weidenfeld & Nicolson, 1985).
 N. Stillman, The Jews of Arab Lands in Modern Times (Jewish Publication Society, 1991).
 C. Tripp, A History of Iraq (Cambridge University Press, 2002)
 Nissim Rejwan, The Last Jews in Baghdad: Remembering a Lost Homeland (University of Texas Press, 2004)
 Naim Kattan, Farewell Babylon (Souvenir Press, 2007)
 Marina Benjamin, Last Days in Babylon: The History of the Jews of Baghdad (Bloomsbury Publishing, 2007)
 Sasson Somekh, Baghdad, Yesterday: The Making of an Arab Jew, Ibis, Jerusalem, 2007
 Eli Amir, The Dove Flyer (Halban Publishers, 2010)
 Mona Yahia, When the Grey Beetles took over Baghdad (Halban Publishers, 2003)

External links

 Iraqi Jews Community By Kobi Arami
 Iraqi Jews Worldwide
 Iraqi Jews who left Baghdad during the 1960s and 1970s 
 Foundation for Sephardic Culture
 The Jewish Community of Baghdad Museum of the Jewish People at Beit Hatfutsot
 Iraq Jews hub at Iraqjews.org
 Tradition of the Iraqi Jews (mostly Hebrew, with links to recordings)
 Iraqi Jews genealogy
 Jewish Virtual Library on the Jews of Iraq
 Babylonia at Jewish Encyclopedia, 1906 ed.
 Iraqi Jews in Israel: Two Iraqi Jewish Museums in Israel at WZO
 A Story of Successful Absorption: Aliyah from Iraq at WZO
 The Last Days in Babylon by Marina Benjamin The story of the Iraqi Jews told through the life of the author's grandmother
 Aiding the Enemy Iraq's recent hatred for Jews makes it an odd place to celebrate Passover for American GIs, By T. Trent Gegax, Newsweek Web Exclusive, MSNBC
 'It Is Now or Never', Iraqi Jews who were stripped of their citizenship and their homes over the past half century may finally get a chance to reclaim them, By Sarah Sennott, Newsweek, MSNBC
 Guide to the Robert Shasha Collection of Iraqi Jewish Oral Histories at the American Sephardi Federation.
 Personal Stories of Jews from Iraq

Films
 2002 – Forget Baghdad: Jews and Arabs – The Iraqi Connection. Directed by Samir.
 2005 – Forgotten Refugees
 2007 – Baghdad Twist. Directed by Joe Balass.
 2013 – Farewell Baghdad. Directed by Nissim Dayan.
 2014 – Shadow in Baghdad. Directed by Duki Dror.

Jewish ethnic groups
 
Iraq

Iraqi diaspora
Ethnic groups in Iraq
 
Sephardi Jews topics